Zamrun is an Indonesian surname. Notable people with the surname include:

 Zulham Zamrun (born 1988), Indonesian footballer
 Zulvin Zamrun (born 1988), Indonesian footballer, twin brother of Zulham

Indonesian-language surnames